Imvani is a settlement some 30 km north of Cathcart and 30 km west of St Marks. It takes its name from the river nearby which in turn was named after a type of wild asparagus, A. stipulacens, the roots of which are eaten either raw or cooked. The form iMvani has been approved.

References

Populated places in the Enoch Mgijima Local Municipality